Atte Hoivala (born 10 February 1992) is a Finnish football player currently playing for VPS. He made his Veikkausliiga debut in the opening match of the 2009 season in a 0–3 defeat against the upcoming champions HJK. On 15 January 2010 he signed a three-year contract with KuPS. He has visited PSV Eindhoven's trial camp twice.

He has made in total of 26 appearances for Finland's youth national teams and was selected by Markku Kanerva to represent Finland U21 in friendly against Luxembourg on 17 November 2010.

He is the son of Finnish volleyball coach Timo Hoivala.

References
Guardian Football
Veikkausliiga

1992 births
Living people
Kuopion Palloseura players
Veikkausliiga players
Finnish footballers
Pallo-Kerho 37 players
Association football defenders
People from Kuopio
Sportspeople from North Savo